Régine Alexandra Chassagne (born 19 August 1976) is a Canadian singer, songwriter, musician, and multi-instrumentalist, and is a member of the band Arcade Fire. She is married to co-founder Win Butler.

Early life and career
Régine Alexandra Chassagne was born in Montreal, Quebec, Canada, and grew up in St-Lambert, a suburb south of Montreal. Her parents, who were of French descent, moved from Haiti during the dictatorship of François Duvalier, which is alluded to in the Arcade Fire song "Haïti", in which she sings,  ("My unborn cousins haunt Duvalier's nights"). The line is in reference to the relatives who were killed during the Jérémie Vespers massacre.

Chassagne attended  before earning a B.A. in communication studies at Concordia University in 1998, and went on to study jazz voice briefly at McGill University. She was singing jazz at an art opening at Concordia in 2000, when Win Butler met her and persuaded her to join his band. They married in 2003. Ten years later, their son was born on 21 April 2013.

Chassagne has also been involved with a medieval-themed band called  and with Jimmy Rouleau in the jazz duo Azúcar. She also wrote the music for the two-minute David Uloth sketch "The Shine", and she contributed to the UNICEF benefit project as part of the North American Hallowe'en Prevention Initiative, performing the song "Do They Know It's Hallowe'en?" along with Win Butler.

She plays many instruments on stage, including accordion, drums, xylophone, hurdy-gurdy, keyboards, organ and guitar. In Arcade Fire, Chassagne performs lead vocals on some songs, including "Haiti", "In the Backseat", "Black Wave/Bad Vibrations", "Empty Room", "Abraham's Daughter", "Sprawl II (Mountains Beyond Mountains)", "Creature Comfort", "Electric Blue", and "Unconditional II (Race and Religion)".

In March 2015, Chassagne, along with Win Butler, attended the launch of music streaming service Tidal, and revealed themselves, along with other notable artists, as shareholders in the company.

Personal life
Chassagne has been married to fellow Arcade Fire member Win Butler since 2003. They had a son in April 2013.

References

External links

Inter Press Service on the Arcade Fire and Régine Chassagne's Advocacy for Haiti

1976 births
Living people
Arcade Fire members
Canadian accordionists
Canadian rock drummers
Canadian indie rock musicians
Concordia University alumni
Canadian women rock singers
Haitian Quebecers
Canadian people of Haitian descent
McGill University School of Music alumni
People from Saint-Lambert, Quebec
Singers from Montreal
Hurdy-gurdy players
Grammy Award winners
Canadian women drummers
French-language singers of Canada
21st-century Canadian multi-instrumentalists
21st-century Canadian pianists
Canadian women pianists
21st-century Canadian keyboardists
21st-century Canadian drummers
Canadian percussionists
Canadian recorder players
21st-century accordionists
Women accordionists
21st-century Canadian women singers
21st-century women pianists
21st-century flautists